The Nut Farm is a 1935 American film directed by Melville W. Brown, adapted from the John Charles Brownell Broadway play of the same name, which ran for 40 performances from 14 Oct.-Nov. 1929 at the Biltmore Theater (now the Samuel J. Friedman Theatre). Wallace Ford is the titled star and the only cast-member common to the play and film. According to the New York Times film review, other than Ford, "There is not much else for it to boast about."

Plot summary 

Bob (Oscar Apfel) and Helen (Betty Alden) decide to move to California and make a fresh start. Bob wants to buy a nut farm, but Helen and her brother Willie Barton (Wallace Ford) dream of being in the movies: Helen as a star, Willie as a director. Film-producing con-artists descend on the family, and comedy ensues.

Differences from play 

The play's original, copyrighted title was It's the Climate (1928).

Cast 
Wallace Ford as Willie Barton
Betty Alden as Helen Barton Brent
Florence Roberts as Ma Barton, Willie's Mother
Spencer Charters as Sliscomb, the Landlord
Oscar Apfel as Bob Bent, Helen's Husband
Bradley Page as Hamilton T. Holland, Acting School
Lorin Raker as Biddleford, Holland's Writer
Arnold Gray as Eustace Van Norton, Holland's Actor
Joan Gale as Agatha Sliscomb

Soundtrack

References

External links 

1935 films
1935 comedy films
American black-and-white films
American comedy films
Films directed by Melville W. Brown
1930s English-language films
1930s American films